Waitan Bridge Station is an underground metro station in Ningbo, Zhejiang, China. Waitan Bridge Station situates on Daqing North Road at the crossing of Jingjia Road. Construction of the station starts in December 2010 and opened to service in September 26, 2015.

Exits 

Waitan Bridge Station has 3 exits.

References 

Railway stations in Zhejiang
Railway stations in China opened in 2015
Ningbo Rail Transit stations